Zawodzie is a district of Katowice, Poland.

Zawodzie may also refer to the following places in Poland:
Zawodzie, Piotrków County in Łódź Voivodeship (central Poland)
Zawodzie, Radomsko County in Łódź Voivodeship (central Poland)
Zawodzie, Lublin Voivodeship (east Poland)
Zawodzie, Silesian Voivodeship (south Poland)